tert-Butyl formate, also known as formic acid tert-butylester and TBF, is a chemical compound with molecular formula C5H10O2.  TBF is one of the possible daughter products of methyl tert-butyl ether biodegradation.

See also
 tert-Butyl acetate

References

Formate esters
Tert-butyl compounds